Hollywood Confidential is a 1997 television film directed by Reynaldo Villalobos. It won an ALMA Award in 1998.

Plot

Cast
 Edward James Olmos as Stan Navarro, Sr.
 Rick Aiello as Joey Di Rosa
 Angela Alvarado as Teresa
 Christine Harnos as Shelly Katz
 A. Day Henden as
 Richard T. Jones as Dexter 
 Brendan Kelly as Mike Mooney 
 Charlize Theron as Sally
 Thomas Jane as Lee
 Evelina Fernández as Mrs. Navarro 
 Valarie Rae Miller as C.C.
 Marissa Ribisi as Zoey

Production
Hollywood Confidential was a pilot for a TV series by Paramount, which would have begun airing in 1996. The pilot would instead air as a stand-alone TV movie on Paramount's UPN in April 1997. Despite the title, it bears no relation to the 1997 film L.A. Confidential, and was produced prior to it.

References

External links
 

1997 films
1997 crime drama films
American crime drama films
Television pilots not picked up as a series
American drama television films
1990s English-language films
1990s American films